Camp Watson was a United States Army camp in central Oregon which operated from 1864 through 1869.

History 

Camp Watson was established by Oregon Volunteers on July 10, 1864.  The 1st Oregon Cavalry built several log buildings, but no surrounding palisade.  The location was chosen to protect the route of the Dalles-Boise Military Road and its travelers, notably gold miners, from attacks by "Snake Indians" during the Snake War.  The camp was abandoned in 1869 following the end that war.

Naming 

The camp was named for Second Lieutenant Stephen Watson, who was killed in battle with Snake Indians on May 18, 1864 at Luelling Springs, Oregon.  His body was recovered the following day and buried temporarily at Camp Maury until a metal coffin was sent from Fort Dalles, at which point he was moved to Fort Vancouver, Washington where he now lies.

Today 

Today the location of Camp Watson is in Wheeler County, Oregon near the unincorporated area of Antone, approximately twenty-three miles east-southeast of the town of Mitchell (all of which were founded after Camp Watson was abandoned).

See also
John M. Drake

References

Pacific Coast Theater of the American Civil War
Oregon in the American Civil War
Military installations in Oregon
Closed installations of the United States Army
Buildings and structures in Wheeler County, Oregon
American Civil War army posts
1864 establishments in Oregon
1869 disestablishments in Oregon
Snake War